Gopi Chand Bhargava (8 March 1889 – 26 December 1966) was the first  Chief Minister of Punjab from 15 August 1947 to  13 April 1949, and again between 18 October 1949, to 20 June 1951, and for the third time as caretaker Chief Minister between 21 June 1964, and 6 July 1964. He was a member of the Congress.

Personal and family life

He was born on 8 March 1889 in Sirsa district of Punjab province in British India. In the year 1912, he completed his M.B.B.S. degree from Medical College (Lahore) and then started the medical profession in 1913.

His brother, Pandit Thakur Das Bhargava, was also an INC politician, former Member of parliament, freedom fighter, lawyer, founder of "Vidya Pracharini Sabha" and several schools and colleges including Thakur Dass Bhargava Senior Secondary Model School and Fateh Chand College for Women at Hisar.

See also
 List of chief ministers of Punjab (India)
 List of chief ministers of Haryana

References

External links
Gopi Chand Bhahava materials in the South Asian American Digital Archive (SAADA)

Chief Ministers of Punjab, India
1889 births
1966 deaths
Chief ministers from Indian National Congress
Place of birth missing
Place of death missing
Indian National Congress politicians from Punjab, India